Samuel San José Fernández (born 1 March 1984), sometimes known simply as Samuel or Samu for short, is a Spanish professional footballer who plays for UM Escobedo as a central defender.

Club career
Born in Santander, Cantabria, Samu was a product of hometown Racing de Santander's youth system. He first appeared for its main squad on 11 September 2005, in a 0–1 home loss against Cádiz CF. He finished the season with seven appearances (all but one were complete matches) and four yellow cards, as the Cantabria side finished 17th in La Liga and narrowly avoided relegation.

After having served one season-long loan stint with Sporting de Gijón in the second division, Samu returned to Racing but, midway through the 2007–08 campaign, would be loaned again, alongside teammate Christian Fernández, to second-level strugglers UD Las Palmas. Both would be instrumental in helping the Canarians retain their league status.

Subsequently, Christian returned to Santander but Samu stayed, signing for three years with the option for a further one. He appeared in an average of 23 games in the following three division two seasons, with the club always managing to stay afloat.

References

External links

1984 births
Living people
Spanish footballers
Footballers from Santander, Spain
Association football defenders
La Liga players
Segunda División players
Segunda División B players
Tercera División players
Deportivo Rayo Cantabria players
Rayo Cantabria players
Racing de Santander players
Sporting de Gijón players
UD Las Palmas players
SD Ponferradina players
UE Costa Brava players
SD Formentera players
San Luis F.C. players
Spanish expatriate footballers
Expatriate footballers in Mexico
Spanish expatriate sportspeople in Mexico